Compsobata mima is a species of stilt-legged flies in the family Micropezidae.

References

Micropezidae
Articles created by Qbugbot
Insects described in 1936